Reach Out is a 1967 album by American composer Burt Bacharach.

Track listing
All tracks composed by Burt Bacharach and Hal David; except where noted.
 "Reach Out for Me" 
 "Alfie" 
 "Bond Street" (Bacharach)
 "Are You There (With Another Girl)"
 "What the World Needs Now Is Love"
 "The Look of Love"
 "A House Is Not a Home"
 "I Say a Little Prayer"
 "The Windows of the World"
 "Lisa"
 "Message to Michael"

Personnel
Burt Bacharach - vocals, arrangements, conductor 
Technical
Henry Lewy - engineer (tracks A4, A5, B3, B4)
Phil Ramone - engineer (tracks A1 to A3, B1, B2, B5, B6)
Jim McCrary - photographer

References 

1967 albums
MCA Records albums
Burt Bacharach albums
Albums produced by Burt Bacharach